Xu Jingye is the name of:

 Li Jingye (died 694), rebel leader during the Tang dynasty, also known as Xu Jingye
 Xu Jingye (PRC) (born 1951), People's Republic of China politician